Bagh-e Dehak (also Romanized as Bāgh-e Dehak) is a village in Raqqeh Rural District, Eresk District, Boshruyeh County, South Khorasan Province, Iran. At the 2006 census, its population was 167, in 45 families.

References 

Populated places in Boshruyeh County